Albany is one of the northernmost suburbs of the contiguous Auckland metropolitan area in New Zealand. The suburb is in the Albany ward, one of the thirteen administrative divisions of Auckland Council. Much of the land to the north of Albany is still semi-rural.

The Māori name for the area was Okahukura (literally, 'place of rainbows' or 'place of butterflies'). The town was originally known as Lucas Creek. By 1890 it was a fruit-growing area and in that year it was renamed 'Albany' after the fruit-growing district called 'Albany' in Australia, pronounced with a short 'a' as in Albert. The name Albany derives from Alba (Gaelic for Scotland) and its Latinisation.

City planning
In 2005, there were plans to turn a major swath of Albany into a planned mini-urban centre, described as a "happy mix of businesses, hotels, shops, apartments, and entertainment (including) an environment of parks and lakes and of tree-lined streets, paths and cycleways linking to the new park-and-ride bus station and the rapid-busway lanes along the Northern Motorway to downtown Auckland", according to a newspaper report. It would be home to 10,000 people. Authorities wanted sound-proofed apartments against outside noise. Initial plans called for hotels, library, municipal swimming pool as well as the headquarters for the North Shore City Council. In some respects, development has proceeded accordingly, but the 2008–09 economic downturn has blunted some of this activity.

Demographics 

Albany had a population of 9,894 at the 2018 New Zealand census, an increase of 1,644 people (19.9%) since the 2013 census, and an increase of 2,649 people (36.6%) since the 2006 census. There were 3,240 households, comprising 4,839 males and 5,055 females, giving a sex ratio of 0.96 males per female, with 1,644 people (16.6%) aged under 15 years, 2,436 (24.6%) aged 15 to 29, 4,416 (44.6%) aged 30 to 64, and 1,401 (14.2%) aged 65 or older.

Ethnicities were 52.2% European/Pākehā, 3.7% Māori, 1.5% Pacific peoples, 42.9% Asian, and 4.8% other ethnicities. People may identify with more than one ethnicity.

The percentage of people born overseas was 57.6, compared with 27.1% nationally.

Although some people chose not to answer the census's question about religious affiliation, 50.7% had no religion, 34.8% were Christian, 0.1% had Māori religious beliefs, 3.2% were Hindu, 2.4% were Muslim, 2.8% were Buddhist and 1.6% had other religions.

Of those at least 15 years old, 2,706 (32.8%) people had a bachelor's or higher degree, and 738 (8.9%) people had no formal qualifications. 1,566 people (19.0%) earned over $70,000 compared to 17.2% nationally. The employment status of those at least 15 was that 3,741 (45.3%) people were employed full-time, 1,203 (14.6%) were part-time, and 312 (3.8%) were unemployed.

Retail and commercial activity 

Albany has become a major substantial shopping and retail zone within the northwestern Auckland area.

The Albany Town Centre area is fast growing in terms of its population and the development of the built environment, following planning decisions and land sales made by central and local governments in the 1980s and 1990s. Through the 1990s industrial and retail areas were rapidly produced, predominantly owned and occupied by local and foreign corporate capital.

Westfield Albany, a major shopping centre, opened in the 1990s. It was expanded in 2007 to cover 53,326 m2, with 2400 carparks and about 140 retailers including Farmers, Kmart, New World and JB Hi-Fi. In May 2011 a tornado ripped the roof off the cinema in the mall.

Albany Mega Centre covers an area of 33,792 m2, with 1300 carparks and 25 retailers including Farmers and The Warehouse. It has occupied the site since at least 2003.

There has been development of a substantial retail project anchored by a 10,000 square metre Mega Mitre 10 store on Oteha Valley Road, across from the North Harbour Stadium, run by Symphony Projects Management.

Albany has been the site of a $500 million so-called Super City showcase development project. Plans in 2006 featured a 200-room hotel, apartment complex with three 30-storey towers, and up to 15 office blocks rising 10 levels high. But in the economic downturn of 2008–09, the project was in dire straits; one report suggested up to 350 investors (many elderly) risked losing up to $20 million.

Albany has a site for Sky Television's Prime TV, as well as the Broadcast Centre for Sky PPV. A large furniture store opened in May 2009 creating up to 30 jobs. Albany also has upscale restaurants, and an outlet store of surf-wear fashion retailer Billabong.

Residential real estate 
Considerable housing development has also taken place since the early 1990s, which has been facilitated by the extension of the Northern Motorway through the area. There are upscale properties; one large property (318 sq m) on 2ha of land, with a six-bedroom three-bathroom five-car garage house with a pool and solar-powered stable for horses including a "hoof soaking path" cost approximately $1.5 million in 2006. In 2005, the rent for a two-bedroom apartment (part of a four-bedroom house with a two-car garage) was $300 per week.

Sports 

Albany has one of the Auckland Region's newest sports facilities, North Harbour Stadium. It draws 25,000 spectators to games and is home to North Harbour rugby team in the ITM Cup and occasionally hosts Super 15 matches of the Blues. It was also a stadium used in the 2011 Rugby World Cup. Albany has a gymnasium where New Zealand taekwondo Olympic representatives Logan Campbell and Robin Cheong trained in 2008 under the guidance of their coach Grandmaster Jin Keun Oh.
 It has a tennis park. Rugby teams practice regularly.

The North Harbour BMX club has a race track at Bush Road, Albany where many New Zealand reps have trained and raced.

Albany is home to the Albany United association football club, who compete in the Northern Regional Football League Division 1. North Harbour Stadium occasionally hosts All Whites matches.

Transportation 
The Albany busway station connecting to the Northern Busway was opened in 2005.

Parks 

The North Shore City council expanded Albany's parkland; in 2007, it paid $3 million for new land totalling . Kell Park reserve next to the new Albany Village Library was known for its free-range Bantam chicken population and pirate ship flying fox playground.

A Council notice stated: "It is prohibited to abandon chickens or to uplift them from this area." It also listed chicken "re-home" options. The city has traditionally allowed chickens to roam free; according to one newspaper report, "chickens are undeniably something of a traditional presence in Albany ... Poultry have been roaming free there for more than 30 years, acquiring an iconic status and helping to attract visitors while inspiring a bronze rooster statue and a logo that's proudly emblazoned on local lamp posts." But in 2008 the Society for the Prevention of Cruelty to Animals objected, causing controversy. There were health issues as well, with bird droppings on playgrounds and seats and picnic areas and incidents of birds being run over by vehicles. But when North Shore City Council officers were ordered to shoot chickens, it caused controversy including an outburst from Auckland City Mayor John Banks, saying the shootings were "an act of wanton destruction and an animal rights outrage." In 2008, while Albany village continues to have a rooster on its logo, the free-roaming chicken population is no more, although there was talk of a managed population at Kell Park.

Education 

Kristin School is an independent composite school offering the International Baccalaureate.

Albany Senior High School opened in 2009 for year 11–13 students. Due to delays in completing the Senior campus, the Senior High School initially shared the Albany Junior High School site. There was controversy about cost overruns when Albany Senior High school was under construction in 2008. The new building opened in 2009 to serve 1400 persons.

All schools are coeducational. The rolls are as of 

Albany contains the northern campus of Massey University. It offers 70 majors plus specialised programmes including Mathematics and Information Sciences, Fundamental Sciences, Food Technology, Engineering, Design, Jazz, Social Sciences, Business, Philosophy and Education. The school has three areas: East Precinct off State Highway 17; Oteha Rohe, off the Albany Highway; Albany Village Precinct off Kell Drive and State Highway 17, where the Schools of Engineering, Design and Psychology are. It has a campus shuttle bus between the three campuses leaving every 40 to 45 minutes. There are bus routes to Albany.

The former Centrepoint commune was on farmland near the town centre. After Bert Potter, its founder and leader, was imprisoned on drug and sex abuse charges in 1992, it declined and in 2000 it closed. It was replaced by the Kahikatea Eco-Village and Art-Space. It has been converted into a research centre for natural medicine, offering courses in aromatherapy, nutrition, naturopathy, herbalism, yoga and ayurvedic medicine.

References

Further reading

External links 
Photographs of Albany held in Auckland Libraries' heritage collections.

Suburbs of Auckland